Cordulegaster trinacriae is a species of dragonfly in the family Cordulegastridae. It is endemic to central-southern Italy, from Abruzzo south to Calabria and Sicily, from where it was first described (hence the scientific name) (Corso 2019, Corso et al. 2020). Its natural habitats are humid forests, rivers, and freshwater springs. It is threatened by habitat loss.

References

Sources
 Corso A., 2019. Morphological variability of Cordulegaster trinacriae in Italy (Odonata: Cordulegastridae). Odonatologica 48 (3/4): 175-201.

 Corso A., Penna V., Janni O., De Lisio L., Biscaccianti A., Holuša O. & Fabio Mastropasqua, 2020.  New data on the distribution of the Italian endemic Cordulegaster trinacriae (Odonata: Cordulegastridae). Odonatologica 49 (3-4): 259-287. DOI: 10.5281/zenodo.4268551

Cordulegastridae
Endemic fauna of Italy
Insects described in 1976
Taxonomy articles created by Polbot